The Constitution of the State of Alabama of 1901 was the basic governing document of the U.S. state of Alabama. Adopted in 1901 and replaced in 2022, it was Alabama's sixth constitution.

At 388,882 words, the document was 12 times longer than the average state constitution, 51 times longer than the U.S. Constitution, and, at the time of its repeal, the longest and most amended constitution operative anywhere in the world. The English version of the Constitution of India, the longest national constitution in the world, is about 145,000 words long, less than 40% of the length of Alabama's (was formerly about one-third, with both expanding over time).

By the time of its repeal, about 90 percent of the document's length was made up of 977 separate amendments (for comparison, the 105 amendments to the Constitution of India form none of the latter's text, as they modify the main body's wording directly rather than being appended to it). About 75 percent of the amendments covered individual counties or cities, and some were so detailed as to deal with salaries of specific officials (e.g. Amendment 480 and the Greene County probate judge). As a result, Alabama had a very high number of constitutional officers. The constitution made it very difficult for residents of most counties to solve their own problems as the limited home rule required them to ask the state legislature to make amendments to the constitution or pass special legislation in order to carry out desired activities.

The Constitutional Convention was called with the intention by southern Democrats of the state "within the limits imposed by the Federal Constitution, to establish white supremacy in this State". Its provisions essentially disenfranchised most African Americans and thousands of poor white Europeans, who were excluded from voting until the Voting Rights Act of 1965. The constitution also gave the Alabama Legislature the power to administer most counties directly, with only a few counties having even limited home rule, further entrenching disfranchisement by limiting local autonomy.

The Preamble says:
We the people of the State of Alabama, in order to establish justice, insure domestic tranquility, and secure the blessings of liberty to ourselves and our posterity, invoking the favor and guidance of Almighty God, do ordain and establish the following Constitution and form of government for the State of Alabama.

History

Prior to the 2022 constitution, Alabama has had six constitutions, all established via State Conventions:  (converting Alabama Territory into a State), 1861 (Secession), 1865 (Reconstruction), 1868 (Reconstruction), 1875 (ending Reconstruction), and the 1901 document.

General overview
The Alabama Constitution, in common with all other state constitutions, defines a tripartite government organized under a presidential system. Executive power is vested in the Governor of Alabama, legislative power in the Alabama State Legislature (bicameral, composed of the Alabama House of Representatives and Alabama Senate), and judicial power in the Judiciary of Alabama. Direct, partisan, secret, free elections are provided for filling all branches.

Notable features

The length and chaotic nature of the constitution was the result of an attempt at centralization of power in the state government dating from the late 19th century, when white Democrats dominated state government.

In addition, because of challenges from Populists in 1892 and 1894 elections, the Democratic Party intended to reduce suffrage in order to secure its own dominance. This appealed to yeomen farmers of North Alabama, who had supported Populists, on the grounds of white supremacy.

The Democrats raised "the Negro issue" and promised that "no white man would lose the franchise". But Alabama's new constitution also "would remove [from voter registration rolls] the less educated, less organized, more impoverished whites as well — and that would ensure one-party Democratic rule through most of the 20th century in the South". Glenn Feldman documented that, by 1941, more whites than blacks had been disenfranchised under this constitution.

The 1901 constitution was intended to curb executive power and to make it difficult to raise taxes, but in practice, it has resulted in the state legislature having extensive authority over counties, cities, and towns. The counties have to go to the legislature, and ipso facto representatives of uninvolved parts of the state, to get the most basic policy and financial laws passed, which often fail to get the support of the full legislature.

As a result, the state legislature devotes considerable time to local matters, and county legislative delegations handle many issues that are normally handled at the county level in most of the rest of the country.

The legislature's power was especially strong during the first half of the 20th century, and it was heavily biased in favor of rural interests. Originally, the state's 67 counties doubled as legislative districts: each county elected one senator and at least one representative, despite differences in population. The county's senator was in an especially powerful position, since the county legislative delegation decided nearly all local matters.

Although the lower house was to be apportioned based on each county's population, the legislature did not reapportion its districts for more than 60 years, despite the state constitution calling for reapportionment each decade after the national census. The vast differences in population between urban and rural counties through those decades resulted in rural areas being grossly over-represented in the legislature, giving them outsized influence over state affairs. Developing urban areas were underserved for decades and ill represented.

As a result of several federal court decisions in 1960-1967 that mandated the principle of "one man, one vote", members of both houses of the legislature are now elected from districts of roughly equal population, and the legislature is required to reapportion itself every decade.

Even with these changes, the legislature still has great power over local government, and devotes considerable time to local issues. With the buildup of the defense industry and regional needs during World War II in Birmingham and its area, Jefferson County was finally afforded limited home rule in 1944. Limited home rule has since been granted to six other counties: Lee, Mobile, Madison, Montgomery, Shelby, and Tuscaloosa.

All the other counties must lobby the local legislation committees of the state House and Senate to pass local ordinances, making passing even the simplest local laws a tedious process. Most county councils or commissions elect their members by at-large voting without proportional representation, which dilutes the political power of significant minorities and generally limits their ability to elect candidates of their choice.

The constitution addresses many issues that are dealt with by statute in most other states, most notably taxation. Unlike most states, a large portion of Alabama's tax code is written into the constitution, necessitating its amendment over even minor tax issues, which prevents most local governments from passing any ordinances on taxation. Although the home rule counties can pass ordinances on tax issues, even that authority is limited. For instance, Jefferson County cannot pass ordinances related to property taxes. According to The New York Times, Alabama's tax code is one of the most regressive in the nation.

Adding to the problem is the requirement that any constitutional amendment must be submitted for a statewide vote if it is not unanimously approved by the legislature. This has resulted in amendments relating to local counties and municipalities being overwhelmingly approved in the affected areas, but rejected statewide.

Racial discrimination
In the 21st century, the document has been criticized for discriminatory elements, though many of these have been made moot by amendments to the federal constitution, passage of federal laws, or United States Supreme Court decisions. As a result, they are not enforced because they are known to be unconstitutional, or would almost certainly be deemed so in court.

At the beginning of the 20th century, the President of the Alabama Constitutional Convention, John B. Knox, stated in his inaugural address that the intention of the convention was "to establish white supremacy in this State", "within the limits imposed by the Federal Constitution". The convention was following a model established by Mississippi, whose 1890 constitution with similar provisions had already survived federal court challenges, with the United States Supreme Court permitting literacy tests and poll taxes despite a challenge based on the 15th Amendment to the U.S. Constitution in Williams v. Mississippi (1898).

Section 181 required voters to pass literacy tests in order to register, which were administered subjectively by white administrators to ensure most blacks were rejected. Section 180 was a grandfather clause, creating an exemption from the literacy test for anyone who had served in the military, or was descended from a veteran. As most slaves had been prevented from serving in the military, freedmen and their descendants could not take advantage of this clause, but many illiterate whites could. Section 194 required the payment of US$1.50 poll tax (Worth approximately US$47.10 by CPI). According to historian Glenn Feldman, by 1940 the cumulative poll tax had disenfranchised more poor white voters than blacks, but this was due to a larger white population; the black population was still disenfranchised at much higher rates than whites. These provisions were invalidated by the Voting Rights Act of 1965, which provided for federal oversight and enforcement of constitutional rights to suffrage.

The state constitution outlawed interracial marriage (Section 102). While this provision was rendered inoperative by the US Supreme Court decision in Loving v. Virginia (1967), it was not removed until 2000 by Amendment 667 approved by voters.

The constitution contains its original requirement for public education to be racially segregated in the state. Section 256 states that "separate schools shall be provided for white and colored children, and no child of either race shall be permitted to attend a school of the other race". This provision was struck down by the United States Supreme Court ruling in Brown v. Board of Education in 1954 that segregation of public schools was unconstitutional, and this clause has not been enforced since the 1960s.

In 1956, following the Supreme Court decision, the legislature passed a constitutional amendment stating that the state did not guarantee a public education for the state's children, and also supported the formation of private schools to evade desegregation. In 1991, a state district judge ruled that this amendment ran counter to the federal Constitution. The state supreme court threw out the underlying case in 2002, but did so in a manner that left the status unclear of the 1956 amendment.

Critics say that the continued existence of segregationist language is an embarrassment to the state in the 21st century.

Attempts to remove
In 2004 and 2012, ballot measures were put before the electorate to remove the segregationist language from the constitution. The 2004 proposal was defeated by less than 2,000 votes; conservatives objected to the proposal because it would have retained a 1901 clause mandating "a liberal system of public schools", and feared it could be interpreted to require expanded financing for public education.

A Constitutional Revision Commission was organized and issued a proposal in 2012 for a vote on an amendment related to education issues. It was intended to delete the original text that mandated segregated schools. However, due to the manner in which the amendment was worded, it would have definitively reinstated the 1956 amendment that ended the guarantee of a public education to children of the state. As a result, it was opposed by both the Alabama Education Association and many black leaders. Both claimed the 1956 amendment could endanger future "legal challenges to the state’s school financing structure, substantially worsening inequality while cosmetically addressing it" by deleting racist language about segregation. Observers believed the bipartisan commission had some chance of success because it was "specifically barred from changing the tax code", but Amendment 4 was narrowly defeated.

In 2020, ballot measure Amendment 4 was put to the electorate, authorizing the State Legislature to recompile the Constitution during its 2022 session: this includes deleting all racist language, along with numerous duplicative and repealed provisions. This measure passed with an overwhelming majority of 66.82% of the electorate voting yes.

The State Legislature met for a Constitutional Convention in 2022 to formally revise the document, where voters were required to approve the new constitution by a simple majority. The House of Representatives unanimously approved the proposed revision on February 24 and the Senate followed suit on March 3. The revision was voted on and passed by the voters in 2022. 

Governor of Alabama Kay Ivey formally proclaimed the new constitution to be in effect on Monday, November 28, 2022, shortly after the state's election results were certified, thus revoking the Constitution of 1901.

Voting restrictions
Section 177 denied women the right to vote by confining voting rights to "male citizens". This was rendered unenforceable by the 19th Amendment to the U.S. Constitution, which provided suffrage to women effective in 1920; nevertheless, the section remained as part of the state constitution until Amendment 579 was substituted, which contained no reference to gender.

Section 182 had disqualified from registering or voting all "idiots and insane persons", and persons who married interracially, or were convicted of "crime against nature" (homosexuality) or vagrancy. This section has also been struck down as unconstitutional.

Size and local relevance
The state legislature has passed numerous amendments to legislate issues that apply only to one or a few counties, as can be seen from the following examples:

 Bingo (Amendments 386 and 387 in Jefferson, further amended by Amendment 413 in Montgomery County, Amendment 440 in Mobile County, Amendment 506 in Etowah County, Amendment 508 in Calhoun County, Amendment 600 in Madison County, Amendment 612 in Russell County, Amendment 674 in Lowndes County, Amendment 692 in Limestone County, and Amendment 699 in Morgan County, the text of which are exactly or almost exactly the same)
 Mosquito control taxes in Mobile County (Amendment 351), which was later amended by Amendment 361 to remove a single word (tangible), then further amended by Amendment 393 to expand it to "other general health purposes" so long as these purposes do not take more than 50% of the collected money.
 Boll weevil taxes on cotton growers (Amendment 449)
 Promotion of catfish (Amendment 492), soybeans (Twice, Amendment 315 and Amendment 401), cattle (Twice, Amendment 201 and Amendment 452), poultry (Twice, Amendment 214 and amended by Amendment 428), swine (Twice, Amendment 327 and  Amendment 400), an omnibus amendment for peanuts, milk, and cotton (Amendment 388), grain (Amendment 453), sheep and goats (Amendment 715), and shrimp and seafood generally (Amendment 766).
 Dead farm animals (Amendment 482) in Limestone County, to be administered by the County Commission
 Prostitution in Jefferson County (Amendment 688).
 Exhumation in Madison County (Amendment 520 by the County Commission), see also the above entry for Dead farm animals in Limestone County
 Forest fire tax levies in Marshall County (Amendment 439)
 Nuisance (Amendment 497 in Jefferson County)

The Legislature has amended amendments to correct language and legislate special taxation (See other sections for more examples):

 Public debt over Mobile County (Amendments 152 and 363 over Amendment 18)
 Promotion of Madison County and Huntsville (Amendment 254 over Amendment 191)
 Special taxation for public healthcare in Mobile County (Amendment 248 over Amendment 195)
 Taxation for "Furtherance of Education" in Jefferson County (Amendments 248, 260, and 298 over Amendment 175)
 Civic center bonds (Amendment 280 over Amendment 238)
 Fire protection and waste collection in Jefferson County (Amendments 314 and 369 over Amendment 239)
 Use of gas taxes (Amendment 354 over Amendment 93)
 Mosquito control taxes (See above)
 The State Judiciary (Amendments) 328, 364, and 426 over the original Article VI, later amendments 580 and 581 were made directly to the article and not previous amendments.
 School taxes in Huntsville (Amendment 407 over Amendment 218)
 Fire department districts in Etowah County (Amendment 445 over Amendment 432)
 The Jackson City Port Authority (Amendment 477 over Amendment 465)
 Constitutional amendments that deal with one county (Amendment 555 over Amendment 425)
 The Madison County Judiciary (Amendment 607 over Amendment 334)
 Corporation taxation (Amendment 662 over Amendment 212)
 Fire/Emergency services taxes in Montgomery County (Amendment 711 over Amendment 551)
 Calhoun County school district taxes (Amendment 720 over 291)
 More fire protection taxes, this time in DeKalb County (Amendment 728 over Amendment 637)
 Court costs for a new Russell County Jail (Amendment 736 over 507)
 Some reservoir Authority in Fayette County, Alabama (751 over Amendment 538)
 Even more fire protection taxes, now in Pickens County (Amendment 765 over Amendment 649)
 Section 97 prohibits deceased officials from receiving a salary.

See also

 The Constitution of India, the world's longest national constitution
 The California Constitution, also known for its length
 The Texas Constitution, also known for its length

References

External links
Proposed Alabama Constitution of 2022
Text of the Constitution
An Overview of Alabama's Six Constitutions

1901 establishments in Alabama
1901 in Alabama
1901 in American law
Alabama law
Alabama
2022 disestablishments in Alabama